Bohan Soloman Cheidu Dixon (born 17 October 1989) is an English professional footballer who plays for Warrington Town as a midfielder.

Career

Connah's Quay Nomads
Born in Liverpool, Dixon started his career with local amateur side Kingsley United before joining Welsh Premier League outfit Connah's Quay Nomads ahead of the 2008–09 season. He went on to make eight substitute appearances for the club,

Buckley Town
He transferred to Cymru Alliance side Buckley Town the following summer. He spent the 2009–10 campaign with Buckley, where he played as a striker rather than in midfield.

Hednesford Town
Dixon then played local-league football in the Liverpool area for a year before being signed by Northern Premier League club Hednesford Town in August 2011. He made his debut for the club on 27 August, coming on as a substitute for Chris Shaw in the 1–2 defeat away at Kendal Town. He went on to make two further appearances for Hednesford, both as a substitute.

Burscough
On 31 October 2011, Dixon joined Burscough on a free transfer along with former Liverpool youth team captain Sean Highdale.

Birkenhead & Wirral League
After leaving Burscough, he played for Sunday league side McGinty's in the Birkenhead & Wirral League, where he was spotted by Accrington Stanley manager Paul Cook. While playing amateur football, Dixon took college courses in construction and aspired to work as a builder.

Accrington Stanley
He signed a one-year contract with Accrington in May 2012. Dixon made his professional debut on 4 September 2012, coming on as a substitute for Karl Sheppard in the 0–2 defeat to Morecambe in the first round of the Football League Trophy.

Marine (loan)
In February 2013, Dixon joined Northern Premier League club Marine on loan, where he remained until the end of the season.

Lincoln City
After being released by Accrington, Dixon signed a one-year contract with Lincoln City in July 2013.

Northwich Victoria
In August 2014 he joined Northwich Victoria, debuting as an 81st-minute substitute in the club's home 0–0 Northern Premier League Division One North draw with Kendal Town.

Salford City
Dixon signed for Salford City on 3 January 2015, scoring on his debut on the same day under the joint management team of Paul Scholes and Phil Neville helping Salford to the Evo Stik Division One North Championship.

Stalybridge Celtic
In July 2015 Dixon signed a 1-year contract with National League North club Stalybridge Celtic.

AFC Fylde
He moved to AFC Fylde in March 2016.

FC Halifax Town
He then moved next to Halifax Town in May 2017.

Stockport County
After just four appearances for Halifax, he joined Stockport County on 11 September 17. At the end of the 2017/18 season, Dixon was released.

Ashton United
In July 2018, Dixon joined Ashton United.

Warrington Town
By September 2018 Dixon was playing for Warrington Town. In July 2021 he signed a new deal with the club.

Career statistics

References

1989 births
Living people
Footballers from Liverpool
English footballers
Association football midfielders
Connah's Quay Nomads F.C. players
Buckley Town F.C. players
Hednesford Town F.C. players
Burscough F.C. players
Accrington Stanley F.C. players
Marine F.C. players
Lincoln City F.C. players
Northwich Victoria F.C. players
Salford City F.C. players
Stalybridge Celtic F.C. players
AFC Fylde players
FC Halifax Town players
Cymru Premier players
Cymru Alliance players
Northern Premier League players
English Football League players
National League (English football) players
Stockport County F.C. players
Ashton United F.C. players
Warrington Town F.C. players